Vumbi is a town and seat of the Commune of Vumbi in Kirundo Province in northern Burundi. During the genocide, the Minister of the Interior met at Vumbi in a meeting on August 7, 1996.

References

External links
Satellite map at Maplandia.com

Populated places in Kirundo Province